Andrew Pervis Scott (born 13 January 1979), commonly known as Andy Scott, is a British entrepreneur and businessman. Scott's main line of business is leisure real estate and he also owns a number of companies in the leisure, recruitment and transport sectors.

Early life
Scott grew up north of Portsmouth in Hampshire UK and was educated at St John's College, Southsea. He started his career at the age of 16, whilst working as a nightclub doorman. Scott started renovating houses and running building sites after being left £5,000 by his grandmother, to purchase his first house for development at the age of 18, going on to develop over 150 properties. He made his first million by the age of 25, owning 7 different hotels personally on the South Coast of England buying his first million-pound hotel at the age of 22. Scott owned a group of café bars, and sold out to Glendola Leisure, staying on the board under a joint venture for two years. Scott lost £6 million in the financial crash of 2008. 

Scott owned two superyachts and sailed around the world on his own and owned Carinae IX, 125 ft (38 m) Robert Harris designed schooner, built in Canada in 2004 and launched by Scott in 2012 in New Brunswick, Canada. Scott has owned and developed a number of hotels, bar groups including Number 1 Leicester Square, one of the largest venues in the West End of London and currently a number of shareholdings and business interests in Europe personally and under REL with six company purchases completed in 2017 and twelve turnaround and high growth businesses under management. Scott rescued the classic Sangermani yacht Telstar from being destroyed in a legal dispute in La Spezia Italy in 2019 and she was refitted for charter on the French and Italian riviera.

Personal life
Scott is a keen offshore and ocean sailor, having raced across the Atlantic Ocean twice and Pacific Ocean. He maintains residences in Jersey, Malta and the United Kingdom.

References

1979 births
Living people
British businesspeople
People educated at St John's College, Portsmouth